The Blue Knight is an American crime drama series that aired on CBS from December 17, 1975 until October 20, 1976. starring George Kennedy as Officer Bumper Morgan. The show was based on the 1973 novel of the same name by Joseph Wambaugh and produced by Lorimar Productions. It was also inspired by the 1973 TV film The Blue Knight, starring William Holden, which ran before the TV show premiered.

Plot 
Bumper Morgan is a veteran police officer in Los Angeles, who continues to patrol the streets in uniform. The series dealt with Morgan's daily dealings with dangerous criminals and drug dealers.

Guest stars included Jim Davis, Robert Hays, Vivi Janiss, Harry Lauter, Gerald McRaney, Bruce Glover, Robert Hoy, and Lee Weaver. After a run of twenty-three episodes the series was cancelled by CBS.

Episodes

Pilot: 1975

Season 1: 1975–76

Season 2: 1976

References

  Encyclopedia of Television Series, Pilots and Specials: 1974-1984 Written by Vincent Terrace
  Television detective shows of the 1970s: credits, storylines, and episode guides for 109 series by David Martindale

External links
 

1975 American television series debuts
1976 American television series endings
1970s American crime drama television series
CBS original programming
English-language television shows
Fictional portrayals of the Los Angeles Police Department
Television shows based on American novels
Television series by Lorimar Television
Television shows set in Los Angeles